Ipirhan Orki (Greek: Υπήρχαν Όρκοι) is the second studio album by Greek musician Giannis Ploutarhos, released on March 22, 2000 by Minos EMI in Greece and Cyprus. This was the first album where Ploutarhos contributed musically. The album was certified double Platinum by the IFPI Greece for sales of at least 80,000 copies, becoming his first album to be certified in Greece and making it his joint third most successful album there.

Track listing

Singles
"Ipirhan Orki"
The first single from the album was "Ipirhan Orki", which was composed by Ploutarhos himself with lyrics by Natali. The music video was directed by Kostas Kapetanidis.

"Fysai Poli"
The second single from the album was "Fysai Poli". The music video was directed by Kostas Kapetanidis and features Ploutarhos and a woman on the beach.

"Paramilao" 
The second single from the album was "Paramilao". The music video was directed by Kostas Kapetanidis and features Ploutarhos on a city rooftop.

"Se Xeperasa"
The fourth single from the album was "Se Xeperasa". No music video was made to accompany the single.

"Se Hano"
The fifth single from the album was "Se Hano". No music video was made to accompany the single.

"To Kalitero Paidi"
The fifth single from the album was "To Kalitero Paidi". The music video was directed by Kostas Kapetanidis and features Ploutarhos on top of a cliff.

"Siga Siga"
The last single from the album was "Siga Siga". There was no music video accompanying the single.

Chart performance

References

External links
Giannis Ploutarhos at Minos EMI official site

2000 albums
Giannis Ploutarhos albums
Greek-language albums
Minos EMI albums